TPEC may refer to:
Traditional Protestant Episcopal Church
The Perumal Engineering College, Chennai, India
Taipei Physical Education College, now the Tianmu Campus, University of Taipei
Transitional Puntland Electoral Commission, which oversees elections in Somalia's Puntland state

See also
TPAC (disambiguation)
List of countries by total primary energy consumption and production